The Spryfield Attack are a Canadian Junior ice hockey team from Spryfield, Nova Scotia.  They compete in the Nova Scotia Junior C Hockey League as members of Hockey Nova Scotia and Hockey Canada and are the winners of the 2014 Maritime-Hockey North Junior C Championship.
Spryfield Attack for the second time were 2015-16 Nova Scotia Junior C Champions and 'silver medalists' in the 2015-16 Maritime North Junior Hockey Champions in New Brunswick.

History
The Spryfield Silver and Black Attack was founded in 1989 as a Junior Hockey Team based out of Spryfield, Nova Scotia.  In their first year, they finished third in the League, and won the Provincial title. The team continued in operation for 1990.  In 1991, the team was turned over to Chebucto Minor Hockey, as their owner and founder, Stephen Adams, became an Alderman for the City of Halifax.

In 2010, Stephen Adams and Paul Strople made a presentation to the Nova Scotia Junior C Hockey League to become the newest Junior B franchise in the province.  That application was unsuccessful.  In 2011, Adams and Strople presented to the NSJCHL, as they sought to become the only Junior C franchise in HRM.  The application was approved unanimously by the league.

In their first year of operation, Spryfield finished third overall and set a league record for wins by a new franchise, with 18. For the 2016-17 season the team shortened their name to the Spryfield Attack.

Coaches
 Paul Strople (2011-2014)
 Alex Mader (2015-2016)
 Dylan Hearns (2016-2017)
 Paul Strople (2017-   )

Season-by-season record
Note: GP = Games played, W = Wins, L = Losses, OTL = Overtime Losses, Pts = Points, GF = Goals for, GA = Goals against, PIM = Penalties in minutes

Maritime-Hockey North Junior C Championship
Atlantic Canada Jr C Championships

External links
Attack website
 Official NSJCHL Website

Ice hockey teams in Nova Scotia
1989 establishments in Nova Scotia
Ice hockey clubs established in 1989